Brownliella is a genus of crustose lichens in the subfamily Brownlielloideae of the family Teloschistaceae. It has four species. The genus was circumscribed in 2013 by Sergey Kondratyuk, Ingvar Kärnefelt, John Elix, Arne Thell, and Jae-Seoun Hur, with the widely distributed lichen Brownliella aequata assigned as the type species. The genus contains species formerly referred to as the Caloplaca cinnabarina species group. The generic name honours Australian botanist Sue Brownlie.

Species
Brownliella aequata 
Brownliella cinnabarina 
Brownliella kobeana 
Brownliella montisfracti

References

Teloschistales
Teloschistales genera
Taxa described in 2013
Taxa named by John Alan Elix
Taxa named by Ingvar Kärnefelt
Lichen genera